Turkish delight or  lokum is a family of confections based on a gel of starch and sugar. Premium varieties consist largely of chopped dates, pistachios, hazelnuts or walnuts bound by the gel; traditional varieties are often flavored with rosewater, mastic gum, bergamot orange, or lemon. The confection is often packaged and eaten in small cubes dusted with icing sugar, copra, or powdered cream of tartar to prevent clinging. Other common flavors include cinnamon and mint. In the production process, soapwort may be used as an emulsifying additive.

The origin of Turkish delight is not precisely known, but the confection is known to have been produced in Turkey and Iran (Persia) as early as the late 18th century.

History 

The exact origin of these sweets is yet to be definitively determined; however, the Turkish word  comes from the Arabic . In the Arab world, Turkish delights are called  which means 'throat comfort'.

The family business, now in its fifth generation, still operates under the founder's name.

Similar Arab and Persian recipes, including the use of starch and sugar, predate Bekir by several centuries. The Oxford Companion to Food states that although Bekir is often credited with the invention, there is no hard evidence for it.

Turkish delight is often sold in hexagonal boxes.

Name
Its name in Greek,  shares a similar etymology with the modern Turkish and it is marketed as Greek Delight. In Cyprus, where the dessert has protected geographical indication (PGI), it is also marketed as Cyprus Delight. In Armenian it is called . It is läoma ܠܥܡܐ in Assyrian. In Persian, it is called . In the Indian subcontinent, a variant of it is known as Karachi halwa or Bombay halwa.

In English, it was formerly alternatively known as Lumps of Delight.

Around the world

Europe

Bulgaria
In Bulgarian, Turkish delight is known as lokum (локум) and enjoys some popularity. While it presumably came with the Ottoman Empire, it may have arrived earlier. Bulgaria produces its own brands of lokum, which may be plain or spiced with rose petals, white walnuts, or "endreshe".

Greece
In Greece, Turkish delight, known as loukoumi [λουκούμι] has been a very popular delicacy since the 19th century, famously produced in the city of Patras (Patrina loukoumia) as well as on the island of Syros and the northern Greek cities Thessaloniki, Serres and Komotini but elsewhere as well. Loukoumi is a common traditional treat, routinely served instead of biscuits along with coffee. In addition to the common rosewater and bergamot varieties, Mastic-flavored loukoumi is available and very popular. Another sweet, similar to loukoumi, that is made exclusively in the town of Serres, is Akanés.

Romania and Moldova
The Romanian word to describe this confection is rahat, an abbreviation of the Arabic rahat ul-holkum. However, in the Romanian language, the word rahat took a pejorative sense, in this case a euphemism that translates as crap. According to linguist Lazăr Șăineanu, Turkish words which entered the Romanian language in the seventeenth century and eighteenth century became mostly obsolete and acquired a pejorative or ironic sense. Politically and socially, this weakened the influence of Ottoman society, and parts of the Ottoman Turkish language which had not had time to take root in the Romanian language took a touch of irony and became a mine for humorous literature.

Albania and in some parts of former Yugoslavia
In the countries of former Yugoslavia that were under Ottomans (Serbia, Bosnia and Herzegovina, Montenegro, North Macedonia, and Kosovo) as well as in Albania, Turkish delight is known as rahat-lokum, ratluk or lokum/llokum. It was introduced during Ottoman rule of the Balkans and has remained popular. Today it is commonly consumed with coffee. Rose and walnut are the most common flavorings.

Ireland, the United Kingdom and Commonwealth countries
Fry's Turkish Delight is marketed by Cadbury in the United Kingdom, Ireland, Australia, South Africa, Canada and New Zealand. It is rosewater-flavoured, and covered on all sides in milk chocolate. UK production moved to Poland in 2010. Hadji Bey was an Armenian emigrant to Ireland who in 1902 set up a company – still in existence – to produce rahat lokoum for the Irish and later UK markets.

North America
The Nory Candy company in the Greater Los Angeles area has been producing Turkish Delights or Rahat Locum since 1964. The company produces different fruit and exotic flavors including rose and licorice as well a variety which include nuts such as almonds, pistachios, and walnuts.

In 1930, two Armenian immigrants, Armen Tertsagian and Mark Balaban, founded Liberty Orchards of Cashmere, Washington, and began manufacturing Aplets (apple and walnut locoum) and Cotlets (apricot and walnut locoum). In 1984, they added the medley-flavored Fruit Delights line in strawberry, raspberry, orange, blueberry, peach, cranberry, and pineapple assortments. Although all of these confections are marketed under American-style brand names, they are described on product packaging as "Locoum".

In Canada, the Big Turk chocolate bar made by Nestlé consists of dark magenta Turkish Delight coated in milk chocolate.

Brazil
The confection is known in Brazil as Manjar Turco, Delícia Turca, Bala de Goma Síria or Bala de Goma Árabe. As with most Middle Eastern dishes, it came with the Levantine Arab diaspora to Latin America.

Philippines
The confection arrived in the Philippines through international trade, likely in the 19th or 20th century. The exact date is unknown. Its popularity, however, only became evident by the 1980's and the 1990's. The Filipino version of the sweet is called chewy gulaman. Gulaman translates to Filipino jelly. Traditionally, chewy gulaman is made from various types of sea plants thriving in the tropical Philippine islands. Once the jelly is formed and has a chewy consistency, it is then covered with either indigenous starch or Philippine coconut shavings to prevent clinging. In recent years, sugar is also used as a covering substitute. Most mass-produced chewy gulaman are nowadays covered in sugar, instead of the traditional coverings.

India/Pakistan

In Karachi, now in Pakistan, the "Karachi halwa" was made with corn flour and ghee and became quite popular. It is said to have been developed by Chandu Halwai which later relocated to Bombay (Mumbai) after the partition in 1947. Some of the confectioners termed it Bombay Halwa to avoid its connection with a Pakistani city.  In the year 1896, a confectioner Giridhar Mavji who ran a shop Joshi Budhakaka Mahim Halwawala attempted to replace the starch with wheat flour and thus invented Mahim halwa which consists of flat sheets.

Protected geographical indication 
Despite its worldwide popularity and production in several countries, at present, the only protected geographical indication (PGI) for such a product is the name Λουκούμι Γεροσκήπου (Loukoumi Geroskipou) for Turkish delight made in Yeroskipou, Cyprus.

Related products

Turkish delight was an early precursor to the jelly bean, inspiring its gummy interior.

There are gourmand perfumes that are based upon Turkish Delight, such as "Loukhoum" by Ava Luxe, "Loukhoum" by Keiko Mecheri, and "Rahät Loukoum" by Serge Lutens.

In popular culture 

Turkish delight figures in the climax of Dorothy Sayers' 1930 mystery novel Strong Poison, part of her Lord Peter Wimsey series. Wimsey convinces the murderer—who developed immunity by consuming arsenic over a long period of time—that the turkish delight he devoured at dinner was smothered in powdered arsenic. The murderer makes no attempt to seek help but flees into the arms of the police. 

Turkish delight features as the enchanted confection the White Witch uses to gain the loyalty of Edmund Pevensie in The Lion, the Witch and the Wardrobe (1950) by C. S. Lewis. Sales of Turkish delight rose following the theatrical release of the 2005 film The Chronicles of Narnia: The Lion, the Witch and the Wardrobe. 

In The Falcon and the Winter Soldier episode "The Whole World is Watching", Baron Zemo similarly uses Turkish delight (which he claims is "irresistible" and was his deceased son's favorite candy) to gain information from a Latvian girl.

The Mickey Mouse TV series episode "Turkish Delights" takes place in Turkey, where Mickey, Donald, and Goofy compete selling the confections at the Grand Bazaar.

The webcomic xkcd comic number 1980 "Turkish Delight" revolves around the author's heightened expectations of and subsequent disappointment in the taste of Turkish delight influenced by The Chronicles of Narnia.

See also 

 Big Turk
 Botan Rice Candy, Gyūhi
 Dodol
 Fry's Turkish Delight
 Gumdrop
 Hadji Bey
 Halva
 Masghati
 Mochi
 Turkish cuisine
 Marron glacé

References

External links 

Candy
Arab desserts
Turkish desserts
Lebanese desserts
Iranian desserts
Iraqi cuisine
Israeli desserts
Kurdish cuisine
Middle Eastern cuisine
Greek desserts
Cypriot cuisine
Balkan cuisine
Bulgarian desserts
Romanian sweets
Tabriz cuisine
Macedonian cuisine
Belarusian cuisine
Albanian cuisine